The Marañón Province is one of eleven provinces of the Huánuco Region in Peru. The capital of this province is the city of Huacrachuco. The province has a population of 23,000 inhabitants as of 2002.

Boundaries
North: La Libertad Region, San Martín Region
East: Leoncio Prado Province
South: Huacaybamba Province
West: Ancash Region

Political division
The province is divided into three districts, which are:

 Cholón (San Pedro de Chonta)
 Huacrachuco (Huacrachuco)
 San Buenaventura (San Buenaventura)

Ethnic groups 
The province is inhabited by indigenous citizens of Quechua descent. Spanish is the language which the majority of the population (74.84%) learned to speak in childhood, 24.75% of the residents started speaking using the Quechua language (2007 Peru Census).

See also
Huánuco Region
Peru

Sources 

Provinces of the Huánuco Region